Monte Galbiga is a mountain of Lombardy, Italy. It has an elevation of 1698 metres.

Mountains of the Alps
Mountains of Lombardy